Norpipe is a subsea oil and natural gas pipelines system in the North Sea.  It supplies oil from the Norwegian Ekofisk and associated fields in the North Sea to the United Kingdom and natural gas to Germany.

Oil pipeline
The Norpipe oil pipeline starts at the Ekofisk 2/4-J facility. In addition to Ekofisk (Cod, Ekofisk, West Ekofisk, Tor, Albuskjell, Eldfisk, Edda, and Embla fields) the pipeline carries oil from Valhall, Hod, Gyda, Ula, Tambar, and Oselvar fields in Norwegian zone, and from several UK's oil fields, such as Fulmar and Judy, see table. It has a landfall at Teesside Refinery in England.

The pipeline is owned by Norpipe Oil AS, a consortium which includes ConocoPhillips Skandinavia AS (35.05%), TotalFinaElf Exploration Norge AS (34.93%), Statoil (18.5%), Eni Norge AS (6.52%), and SDFI (5%). It is operated by ConocoPhillips Skandinavia AS. The pipeline was commissioned in 1975. The Petroleum Safety Authority Norway has granted consent to use the pipeline until 2028. The Norpipe oil pipeline originally had two intermediate booster pump installations in the UK sector designated 37/4A and 36/22A, these were seldom used and were subsequently bypassed. The booster platforms were removed in 2009/10 as part of the greater Ekofisk decommissioning.

Booster pumping stations 
The specification of the booster station was as follows.

UK fields and Norpipe 
The following fields and installations export oil into the Norpipe pipeline.

Throughput 
The annual oil production from 1998 (in 1000 tonnes) was:The total oil throughput of the terminal up to the end of 2021 was 104.585 million tonnes.

Natural gas pipeline
The natural gas pipeline was commissioned in 1977 and will be in use until 2028. The start-up investment was 26.4 billion Norwegian krone. The pipeline is owned by Gassled and operated by Gassco. The technical service provider is ConocoPhillips.

On 30 September 1995, a German cargo ship Reint collided with the Norpipe H7-platform in the German continental shelf. Only minimal damages to the platform, and no injuries to people were caused.  The H7 platform has been off-the-service since 1999, and in 2007 a bypass pipe laid around the platform.

See also

 Europipe I
 Europipe II
 Franpipe
 MIDAL

References

External links
 Norpipe (Gassco website)

Energy infrastructure completed in 1975
North Sea energy
Natural gas pipelines in Germany
Natural gas pipelines in Norway
Oil pipelines in Norway
Oil pipelines in the United Kingdom
Equinor
ExxonMobil buildings and structures
Shell plc
ConocoPhillips
Eni
TotalEnergies
Pipelines under the North Sea
Norway–United Kingdom relations
Energy infrastructure completed in 1977
1975 establishments in Norway
1977 establishments in Norway
1975 establishments in England
1977 establishments in West Germany